Jubilation is the fourth album by the country rock trio, consisting of brothers Chris, Lorin and Peter Rowan, credited as "The Rowans". It is their third effort recorded as trio with Peter Rowan.

Track listing
 "Best of Friends" (Lorin Rowan) 3:06
 "Give Ya Good Lovin'" (Peter Rowan) 3:16
 "Hoo Doo Love" (Chris Rowan) 5:20
 "Love' Secret Sighs" (Chris Rowan, Peter Rowan) 2:35
 "Don't Say Goodbye" (Peter Rowan) 3:40
 "Lovelight" (Chris Rowan) 4:17
 "New Horizons" (Lorin Rowan) 4:42
 "Makin' It Easy" (Chris Rowan, Peter Rowan) 3:41
 "Calle Music" (Lorin Rowan) 5:14

Personnel
Peter Rowan - guitar, mandolin, vocals
Chris Rowan - guitar, piano, vocals
Lorin Rowan - guitar, mandolin, vocals
Terry Adams - cello
Susan Bates - viola
Nancy Ellis - viola
Brad Bilhorn - drums
Stephne Busfield - guitar
Joe Carroll - bass
Ralph Carter - bass
Peter Barshay - bass, drums
Brian Cooke - piano
Glenn Cronkhite - percussion
Glen Deardorff - violin, guitar
Keith Glanz - drums
Stephane Grappelli - violin
Lee Carlton - drums
Bob Hogins - keyboards
Daniel Kobialka - violin

Production
Michael Zagaris - photography

References

The Rowans albums
1977 albums
Asylum Records albums